HMS Nyasaland (K587) was a  of the United Kingdom that served during World War II. She originally was ordered by the United States Navy as the Tacoma-class patrol frigate USS Hoste (PF-83) and was transferred to the Royal Navy prior to completion.

Construction and acquisition
The ship, originally designated a "patrol gunboat," PG-191, was ordered by the United States Maritime Commission under a United States Navy contract as the first USS Hoste. She was reclassified as a "patrol frigate," PF-83, on 15 April 1943 and laid down by the Walsh-Kaiser Company at Providence, Rhode Island,  on 7 September 1943.  Intended for transfer to the United Kingdom, the ship was renamed Nyasaland by the British prior to launching and was launched on 6 October 1943, sponsored by Mrs. William A. Cahir.

Service history
Transferred to the United Kingdom under Lend-Lease on 31 July 1944, the ship served in the Royal Navy as HMS Nyasaland (K587) on patrol and escort duty.

Disposal
The United Kingdom returned Nyasaland to the U.S. Navy on 15 April 1946. She was sold to the Sun Shipbuilding & Dry Dock Company of Chester, Pennsylvania, on 10 November 1947 for scrapping.

References

Notes

Bibliography
 
 Navsource Online: Frigate Photo Archive HMS Nyasaland (K 587) ex-Hoste ex-PF-82 ex-PG-191

External links
 Photo gallery of USS Hoste (PF-83) and HMS Nyasaland (K 587)

1943 ships
Ships built in Providence, Rhode Island
Tacoma-class frigates
Colony-class frigates
World War II frigates and destroyer escorts of the United States
World War II frigates of the United Kingdom